Frederick James Hancock (born 1873) was a British trade union leader.

Hancock was born in Talke in Staffordshire.  He attended the Butt Lane National School, and then spent some time studying at Allegheny College in Pennsylvania.

Hancock worked as a coal miner in Staffordshire, and became active in the North Staffordshire Miners' Association, serving as its financial secretary from 1914.  This role brought him greater prominence in the movement, and in 1926 and 1927 he served on the executive of the Miners' Federation of Great Britain.  In the early 1930s, Samuel Finney, the general secretary of the North Staffordshire Miners, retired, and Hancock won the election to succeed him.  He was also elected to succeed Finney as president of the Midland Miners' Federation, to which the North Staffordshire Miners were affiliated.  He frequently attended the Trades Union Congress, and in 1937 was its delegate to the Trades and Labour Congress of Canada.

Hancock retired in 1941.  In his spare time, he served as a Methodist lay preacher.

References

1873 births
Year of death missing
Allegheny College alumni
British coal miners
Trade unionists from Staffordshire
General secretaries of British trade unions
Presidents of British trade unions
People from Talke